The 2019 Football Championship of Zakarpattia Oblast was won by Sevliush Vynohradiv.

League table

References

Football
Zakarpattia
Zakarpattia